Bicilia olivia is a moth in the family Crambidae. It was described by Arthur Gardiner Butler in 1878. It is found on Jamaica.

References

Moths described in 1878
Spilomelinae